Rousset is a commune in the Bouches-du-Rhône department in southern France close to Aix-en-Provence.

History
Although Rousset can be traced back to the Romans, the first written mention comes in a 1050 document, under the name of "Rosselun" or "roscetum rosetum". In the Middle Ages, a castle as well as  a church and chapels were built, as dwellings increased.

In the 9th century, Rousset belonged to the Abbey of Saint-Victor, then by 1143 the Knights Templar took over, followed by the Knights of Malta in 1307. In the 15th century, it belonged to Guillaume de Littera (1371-1452).

Under the French Revolution, the castle was destroyed.

The church was built in 1861.

Cross of Provence
The fourth Croix de Provence on the Montagne Sainte-Victoire was erected in 1875, on the initiative of the parish priest of Rousset, Father Meissonnier, to ward off two evils: smallpox and the aftermath of the Franco-Prussian war of 1870.

Population

Twin towns
Rousset is twinned with Kirkop in Malta.

See also
Communes of the Bouches-du-Rhône department

References

External links

Official website

Communes of Bouches-du-Rhône
Bouches-du-Rhône communes articles needing translation from French Wikipedia